is a Japanese politician of the Liberal Party and a member of the House of Councillors of Japan in the Diet (national legislature). She was previously with the Democratic Party of Japan and briefly belonged to the Tomorrow Party of Japan founded by Yukiko Kada, of which she was the deputy leader. A native of Niigata and graduate of Niigata University, she was elected to the House of Councillors for the first time in 2001 after serving in the town assembly of Yokogoshi, Niigata between 1999 and 2001.

References

External links 
  in Japanese.

1956 births
Living people
People from Niigata (city)
Female members of the House of Councillors (Japan)
Members of the House of Councillors (Japan)
Democratic Party of Japan politicians
People's Life Party politicians